Fire Power (also Firepower) is a military tank action game developed by Silent Software for the Amiga. It was released in 1987 and published by MicroIllusions and Activision. Ports were released for the Apple IIGS, the Commodore 64 and for MS-DOS in 1988. An Atari Lynx version was planned but development never started due to internal conflict with Epyx.

Summary
The gameplay consists of controlling a tank through an expansive, outdoor landscape. Each map has at least two bases - one for the green team, and one for the yellow (red in the PC version) team. Initially, the base locations were hidden from the players, so an extensive search of the landscape had to be conducted first.
Nonetheless, many players chose to rampage around the map, simply blasting away. Obstacles included enemy turrets spread around the map, various fortifications and destructible buildings. If the player stood still for too long (to set up an ambush, for instance), a series of enemy helicopters would appear from off screen and attack. The helicopters could be shot down with the tank's main weapon.

Bases and tanks 
Each base has several different types of buildings, such as armories, barracks, and bio-domes. The objective is to capture the flag from inside the enemy base by blasting through walls and destroying any defenses. You could also rescue prisoners of war by destroying the POW camps that were scattered throughout the enemy base. Destroying the camps would allow the captives to hop in your tank for a ride back to your base. An extra tank life is rewarded for each fifteen POWs rescued.

Three different tanks are available: one is fast and fragile, one is slow but strong, and the third is rated in between the two. Each tank could carry a different amount of POWs. To capture the enemy flag, you had to carefully maneuver your tank into the flag building and drive over the enemy flag to pick it up. Your weapons could not destroy garages.

Features
The game includes the ability to run over enemy soldiers, crushing them with an accompanying "squish" sound effect and a bloody "splat" that remains on the battlefield for several minutes.  A map editor allows creation of custom multiplayer experiences.

Fire Power can be played alone, against a human opponent on a split screen, or over a modem, which allowed players to chat with each other while playing.

Reception
Roy Wagner reviewed the game for Computer Gaming World, and stated that "I find Fire Power to be a fair priced design with exceptional presentation. In other words, it is a great shoot 'em up arcade wargame."

Reviews
Computer and Video Games (Jun, 1988)
ACE (Advanced Computer Entertainment) (Oct, 1989)
ACE (Advanced Computer Entertainment) (Jul, 1988)
Info (Nov, 1987)
The Games Machine (Jun, 1988)
Commodore User (Jun, 1988)
Games-X (Aug 08, 1991)
Commodore Format (Jun, 1991)
ST/Amiga Format (Jul, 1988)
Commodore User (Oct, 1989)
The Games Machine (Nov, 1989)
Australian Commodore and Amiga Review (Apr, 1990)
Your Amiga (Jun, 1988)

Legacy
Fire Power spawned two sequels, Return Fire and Return Fire 2.

References

External links

Firepower at Lemon Amiga

1987 video games
Action video games
Amiga games
Apple IIGS games
Cancelled Atari Lynx games
Commodore 64 games
DOS games
Tank simulation video games
Video games developed in the United States
MicroIllusions games
Multiplayer and single-player video games
Silent Software games